Adrian der Tulpendieb was a 1966 West German television series; the first that aired in full color. Six episodes were produced, which were based on the novel by Otto Rombach and directed by Dietrich Haugk. The official start of color television in Germany was not until August 25, 1967. The series was later repeated on ARD's early evening program.

See also
List of German television series

External links
 

Television series set in the 17th century
Television shows set in the Netherlands
1966 German television series debuts
1966 German television series endings
German-language television shows
Das Erste original programming